Schirkoa is an Indian 14-minute animated short film written, directed, and animated by Ishan Shukla. On its premiere, the short film qualified for The Academy Award after winning the 'Best Animated Short' award at LA Shorts Fest. It's the first Indian Animated short to ever qualify for the Oscars. It also won the 'Best in Show' award at SIGGRAPH Asia.

Premise
In the city of Bag-heads, a politician is torn between his career, brothels and his love for a shadowy woman.

Production
First conceived as a graphic novel in 2012, Shukla worked on it on and off along with a day job for four years. The short was created using Autodesk Maya, Adobe Creative Cloud and Redshift. Schirkoa was funded through personal savings. Shukla's wife Sharad Varma served as the producer of the film. Although the film is made in 3D, it has a stylized 2D look that's been achieved through a number of techniques.

Accolades 
Schirkoa has been screened in over 50 film festivals all over the world. It will continue its festival run till mid 2018.

Reception 
Schirkoa has been listed in the Zippy Frames Annual list of Top animated shorts of the 2016. Jeroen Van Rossem of Kortfilmcalls it "frequently reminiscent of Blade Runner, Brazil, Children of Men and 1984. Cult Critic Magazine praises the mature theme of the animated film, calling it "a prototype for a much longer feature or series".

References

External links 
Official Website
Sound design & composer
Schirkoa at the Internet Movie Database

2016 short films
Indian short films
2010s English-language films